Paraswadi is a village in the Palghar district of Maharashtra, India. It is located in the Dahanu taluka.

Demographics 

According to the 2011 census of India, Paraswadi has 241 households. The effective literacy rate (i.e. the literacy rate of population excluding children aged 6 and below) is 36.75%.

Culture 
Every year on Dussehra, the Gondi villagers of Paraswadi celebrate by holding a procession where they carry an image of Ravana riding on an elephant, as they claim that he was their ancestor-king.

References 

Villages in Dahanu taluka